Wesley Vale is a locality and town in the local government area of Latrobe on the North West coast of Tasmania, Australia. It is located approximately 10 km East of Devonport, and 10 km west of Port Sorell.    
The 2016 census determined a population of 443 for the state suburb of Wesley Vale.

Wesley Vale has a primary school, Andrews Creek Primary School, which stands on the site of the former Wesley Vale Primary School, established in 1899.

History
The locality was gazetted in 1962.

Geography
The waters of Bass Strait form the northern boundary. The northern section of the locality contains Devonport Airport.

Road infrastructure
The B74 route (Port Sorell Road) forms part of the western boundary before turning east and crossing the locality. Route B71 (Frankford Road) starts at an intersection with B74 on the south-western boundary and runs through from south-west to south-east. Route C701 (Pardoe Road / Mill Road) starts at an intersection with B74 on the western boundary, running north-east, east, and south before returning to B74 in the eastern part of the locality. A second section of C701 (Wesley Vale Road) starts from near the end of the first section and runs south, crossing B71 and ending at C702 just inside the southern boundary.

References

Localities of Latrobe Council
Towns in Tasmania